Scare Package is a 2020 American anthology horror comedy film created by Aaron B. Koontz and Cameron Burns. It features a series of horror shorts written and directed by Aaron B. Koontz, Courtney Andujar, Hillary Andujar, Anthony Cousins, Emily Hagins, Chris McInroy, Noah Segan, and Baron Vaughn.

The film debuted at the Sitges Film Festival in October 2019, and was released exclusively on Shudder on June 18, 2020.

A sequel to the film was announced late 2021. Scare Package II: Rad Chad's Revenge was released on Shudder December of 2022.

Plot 
The film is presented as an anthology of short horror films, built into a frame narrative which acts as its own horror film. The frame narrative focuses on Chad Buckley, a horror aficionado who runs a struggling video store. He takes on a new hire, much to the chagrin of an obnoxious regular customer named Sam who has been trying to persuade Chad to hire him for years. The shorts are films that are either described to other characters or viewed as one of the video rentals offered at the store.

"Rad Chad's Horror Emporium, Horror Hypothesis"/Frame narrative/"Horror Hypothesis" 
The film opens with the short "Cold Open", after which Mike (one of the people featured in the short) is shown describing the short as a horror movie pitch to Chad, who picked him up as a hitchhiker. After dropping off Mike Chad opens his video store, Rad Chad's Horror Emporium, and rejects Sam's latest attempt at employment. Another person, Hawn, applies for the same position and is instantly hired. Sam arrives at the checkout counter with a videotape he wants to rent and describes the opening of the movie, which begin the next segment, "One Time In The Woods". As the day progresses Chad trains Hawn and a series of events prompts the launch of the other shorts, which make up a large portion of the film. 

Chad is ultimately betrayed by Hawn, who was actually part of a scientific group running experiments on a serial killer known as the  "Devil's Lake Impaler" under the video store. Imprisoned with several others, Chad identifies the others as horror character stereotypes, the jock, the stoner, the slut, the token black guy and the final girl, Chad realizes he's the know-it-all-horror-guy and they're all in an actual horror movie.  When the Impaler inevitably overcomes his captors, Chad chooses to flee with the person he identifies as the final girl and the stoner. While escaping Chad learns that cars cannot start if the killer is within 14 meters of the car and that the Impaler became a serial killer after a group of frat boys killed his friend Jimmy. The remaining group members reunite, at which point Chad realizes that he had misidentified the slut and final girl. Their escape is halted when they discover that security protocol prevents the elevator from allowing them to reach the exit, however they are assisted by the sudden appearance of Joe Bob Briggs, who dies in the process. Chad is then killed by the Impaler, who follows the true final girl and the stoner to the surface. 

The stoner tricks the Impaler into believing him to be Jimmy and the final girl manages to incapacitate him, however the stoner dies after trying to move the body away so that they can start the getaway car. The final girl flees to a field, where she wakens from a nightmare to discover that the Impaler is in the car with her. She dodges his assault and runs out of the car, where Mike from the Cold Open intercepts her and tosses a cigarette causing the car to explode and presumably kill the Impaler.

"Cold Open" 
Mike Myers is a stock, horror movie background character tasked with facilitating the horrible circumstances other unsuspecting horror characters find themselves in. He fiddles with a loose road sign arrow indicating the location of an insane asylum. The arrow spins in the wrong direction, causing a group of unsuspecting young people on their way to a camp, to instead drive to the insane asylum.

Mike vents about his job to his friend Wendy, and in a series of flashbacks, we see Mike at work... planting satanic relics in an attic, fooling a house buying couple into buying a haunted house, and setting up a cursed doll.  Mike expresses a desire to be an actual character and not just a cold open.

Mike cuts the power to a house where two women are babysitting on Halloween.  Instead of leaving like he's supposed to, he sticks around.  The women realize he's the one who cut the power so come up with a plan and invite him in.  Hannah attacks Mike with his wire cutters, but slips and falls on some candy Mike dropped, impaling herself in the neck.  Tess sneaks up behind Mike as he tries removing the cutters from Hannah's neck, and he accidentally stabs Tess with them. Mike puts on a white mask to keep from being sprayed in the face with blood from Tess' wound, then picks up her bloody knife. Wendy shows up as a cop and shoots Mike in the shoulder, believing he is a masked killer.

"One Time In The Woods" 
Trip, Mark, Dawn and Brenda are camping in the woods. Mark steps in some mysterious green goo that he thinks is bug guts. A crazed man shows up warning them to leave and that he is going to kill them. The man falls, starts convulsing and expelling green and orange goo. Dawn and Brenda beat him with sticks, and the man instructs them to use silver as his skin begins to rip from his body, spraying blood all over Dawn and Brenda. Trip puts silver handcuffs on the man as he deforms into a pile of goo, blood and guts, the silver having paused the transformation. Trip puts on a mask, and the goo-man identifies him as the "Back Woods Slasher". Mark tries throwing an axe at him but misses and instead hits a passing biker in the genitals. Trip bear hugs Mark, causing his guts to spill out, killing him. Dawn and Brenda run into the woods. Brenda accidentally impales herself in the mouth on a tree branch. Trip throws a large rock at her head, exploding it. Dawn runs further into the woods. A man approaches her and asks where the goo-man is. Trip pulls the man's legs off and beats him with them. Trip chases Dawn back to the camp site and slips in some green goo, falling and impaling his face on the back of the axe stuck in the biker's genitals. Goo-man bites Dawn and she transforms into a pile of green goo too.

"M.I.S.T.E.R." 
A Husband sits alone at a bar, chatting with the Bartender, who creeps the husband out. The Husband goes to the bathroom and notices a flyer advertising an organization called M.I.S.T.E.R., which stands for Men In Serious Turmoil Establishing Rights. As The Husband ponders the flyer, we flashback to an argument between him and his wife where she complains about his lack of effort with the family and wants him to be a man. 

The Husband goes to a M.I.S.T.E.R. meeting where the group's leader is giving a pep talk to the men in attendance. In a montage, we cut back and forth between the members complaining about their neutered lives. After the meeting the leader talks with the Husband, encouraging him to join the group and invites him to a get-together happening that night.

The Husband goes home and is about to put something in a duffel bag, but we don't see what. He arrives at the get-together that takes place on a football field. The leader snaps his fingers and the lights to the stadium go out. The group transforms into werewolves. The Husband kills each werewolf one by one using different weapons. 

The Husband comes home to a party his wife has put on. He shows her some werewolf fur he's skinned from one of the wolves. Everyone dons black robes and commence a ceremony with a pentagram in the middle of the floor.

"Girls Night Out Of Body" 
Ray browses the isle of a convenience store. She's being stalked by an unseen person who breathes heavily. She notices a lollipop in the shape of a human skull that says "Not For Sale". She steals the lollipop and leaves the store with Ali. The Store Clerk eyes them suspiciously. Ray and Ali get in the car with their friend Jamie, who drives. The stalker from the store watches them from inside another car. The stalker follows them as they drive to a hotel. 

The stalker watches them through the window of the room as they start drinking and listening to music. Ray reveals the lollipop she stole. Ali and Ray lick the lollipop. From the stalker's POV we see Jamie look toward the window and close the curtains. Ali feels strange and goes to lay down, putting a towel over her face. After a while, Jamie checks on her and startles her awake, the towel falling to the floor. Ray and Jamie are stunned, as Ali's face has transformed into the same skull like form as the lollipop. Ray's face also transforms into the skull shape. Thinking she can fix the problem, Jamie calls the convenience store, asking for help. The Store Clerk emits an evil, monstrous laugh. Jamie reaches for the lollipop skull and puts it over her face as the stalker reaches for the door handle. Jamie licks the lollipop. She pulls the stalker into the room and they kill him. They dance and have a pillow fight.

"The Night He Came Back Again! Part IV: The Final Kill" 
Daisy (Chelsey Grant)and Greg are in bed kissing. Someone watches them from the ajar closet. Suddenly the window is smashed and a Masked Killer climbs through the window. Before the killer can stab Daisy, a group of her friends spring from the closet and subdue the killer with stun batons. We dissolve to the garage, where the killer wakes up, tied to a table, surrounded by Daisy and her friends. Daisy expresses her anger at the killer for killing her friends and boyfriends every year. Someone hands her a knife and she stabs the killer in the chest. The killer wakes up and she stabs him over and over again. Greg tries to demonstrate that the killer is dead, but the killer stabs him in the back of the head with the knife. Next they attach jumper cables to the killer's body and shock him with a car battery. Seth checks his vitals with a stethoscope, but a bolt of electricity from the killer's heart travels up the stethoscope and explodes Seth's head. Next they stuff firecrackers down the killer's mouth. The firecrackers go off, cutting the killer in half. Chloe picks up the killer's lower half, and his legs come to life, wrapping themselves around her, choking her. Will tosses the killer's intestines over the ceiling beam and pulls, causing the legs to lift Chloe into the air, killing her. Will professes his love to Daisy, but the killer watches, taunting them. Daisy grabs a shotgun and tells Will to unmask the killer. Will takes off the killer's mask, revealing an attractive man. Daisy hesitates in shooting him. The killer grabs Will by the throat, choking him. Daisy can't bring herself to shoot him, and Will dies. Daisy finally pulls the trigger, blowing a hole in the killer's head. She calls and rents a wood chipper. She shoves the killer's body into the wood chipper as he reveals that he's her brother. She tries to stop but it's too late. She watches a 4th of July fireworks display. The killer's reformed hand comes out of the pool of blood.

"So Much To Do" 
An unseen person drives wearing black leather gloves. A man is tied with rope and locked in the trunk of the car. The car parks and two mysterious men in all black drag the tied man to a grave site. The tied man wakes up and pleads that he has so much to do. One of the mysterious men removes a glove, revealing a mysterious symbol glowing with light. He burns the symbol into the tied man's forehead and kicks him into the grave. They bury him alive. 

Later, smoke emerges from the grave and travels across the ground. Franchesca sits alone in her car, parked in a nearby empty field. She is on the phone with a friend, warning her not to spoil a TV show they're discussing. She hasn't caught up and the finale is tonight. The smoke approaches and engulfs the car. Franchesca gets out to investigate. She gets back in her car and the phone signal breaks up. Franchesca is startled by the marked man who is standing in front of her car.  The man vaporizes into smoke and her windows break. She breathes in the smoke and the windows reform and fix themselves. Franchesca says she has so much to do, the same line the marked man spoke before being buried. She looks in the rearview mirror and we see the marked man. 

The marked man comes home and sits down to watch TV. It is the finale of the show Franchesca didn't want spoiled. Franchesca calls out to him and he goes to the mirror, revealing her standing next to him, claiming he has her body. They get into a physical confrontation, and fight over the remote. She hits him so hard he vaporizes and she has her body back. All beaten up, she goes to her car and checks her phone. A text from a friend spoils the end of the show. She drives off and the two mysterious men from earlier follow her.

Cast

"Cold Open"
 Luxy Banner as Hannah
 Sydney Huddleston as Tess
 Haley Alea Erickson as Wendy
 Jon Michael Simpson as Mike Myers
 Chris Bowlsby as House Buying Husband
 Christine Hall as House Buying Wife
 Cassandra Hierholzer as Ghost

"Rad Chad's Horror Emporium"
 Jeremy King as Chad
 Hawn Tran as Hawn
 Byron Brown as Sam
 Jon Michael Simpson as Mike Myers
 Dana Magaha as Customer
 Logan Magaha as Customer's Son

"One Time In The Woods"
 Jessie Tilton as Brenda
 Kirk Johnson as Tommy
 Carlos Larotta as Mark
 Stephanie Thoreson as Dawn
 Mac Blake as Hank
 Will Elliot as Trip
 Jon Copp as Biker

"M.I.S.T.E.R."
 Noah Segan as Husband
 Frank Garcia-Hejl as Frank
 Jonathan Fernandez as Bartender
 Jocelyn Deboer as Wife
 Allan Mcleod as MISTER member
 Don Fanelli as MISTER member
 Jon Gabrus as MISTER member
 Kale Hills as MISTER member
 Luis Jose Lopez as Partygoer
 Peter S. Kim as Partygoer
 Stacy Ines as Partygoer
 Eric Lewis Baker as Partygoer
 Leo Zapata as Partygoer
 June Mccool Segan as The Baby

"Girls Night Out Of Body"
 Gabrielle Maiden as Jamie
 Melanie Minichino as Ali
 Atsuko Okatsuka as Ray
 Clarita Cabandong as Store Clerk
 Ben Fee as Cableknit Stalker
 Manuel Taylor-Alcocer as Radio Announcer
 Emily Andujar as Evil Laugh

"The Night He Came Back Again! Part IV: The Final Kill"
 Chelsey Grant as Daisy
 Jack Hartwig as Will
 Julie McCarthy as Chloe
 Jameson Pieper as Seth
 Nicolas Sulivan as Greg
 Tommy David as The Killer

"So Much To Do"
 Toni Trucks as Franchesca
 Aaron D. Alexander as Marked Man
 Candice Thompson as Maggie
 Jules Gonzalez as man In Black
 Billy Hedgecock as man In Black
 Travis Michael Keller as man In Black
 Baron Vaughn as Jay Battle
 Baron Vaughn as Ray "DATWIN" Battle
 Baron Vaughn as Bruce Leroi Jones

"Horror Hypothesis"
 Jeremy King as Chad
 Zoe Graham as Jessie
 Chase Williamson as Pete
 Josephine McAdam as Kelly 
 Justin Maina as Brandon
 Dustin Rhodes as Devil's Lake Impaler
 Gregory Kelly as Devil's Lake Impaler (Additional Scenes)
 Joe Bob Briggs as himself
 Kelsey Pribilski as Christine
 Andre Williams as Craig
 Brian Villalobos as Tony
 Spencer Greenwood as Gary
 Avery Moore as Dixie The Intern
 Hawn Tran as Hawn
 Peggy Scott as Mary Ellen (Scientist)
 Les Best as Earl Birch (Scientist)
 Byron Brown as Sam 
 Tristan Riggs as Jimmy The Cancer Boy
 Holt Boggs as Officer Polderneck
 Jon Michael Simpson as Mike Myers
 Mitchell Rad as Impaled Security Guard
 Sam Stinson as Impaled Security Guard
 Lawrence Varnado as Impaled Security Guard
 Don Daro as Hawn Security Guard
 Christopher Wimbush as Hawn Security Guard
 Fontessa Booker as Scientist
 Jesse Ferraro as Scientist
 Marzipan as Cat

Genesis 
In an interview with Entertainment Weekly, writer/director/producer Aaron B. Koontz revealed his approach to creating a horror anthology. "I'm a big fan of anthology films but knew we had to change the game up a bit," said Koontz in a statement. "So we gathered this hungry group of diverse, super-talented horror enthusiasts and asked them to subvert these well-known horror tropes while also paying homage to them. In the end, it made for a unique experience that I cannot wait for audiences to discover."

Release 
The film was released exclusively on Shudder on June 18th, 2020.

Reception 
The film holds an approval rating of 82% at Rotten Tomatoes, based on 33 reviews with an average rating of 7/10. The website's critical consensus reads, "Some of its contents are more entertaining than others, but genre fans should still find this Scare Package well worth opening." Slashfilm wrote "Scare Package is destined to become a midnight crowd favorite, a consistently funny love letter to the genre, made by people who love horror for people to love horror." We Got This Covered remarked that although the film has "a few bumps in the road... it's a horror satire made by horror devotees who want to laugh alongside fans who've dedicated entire lives to a genre that's self-admittedly not without its faults."

References

External links
 

2019 horror films
American horror anthology films
American comedy horror films
Films produced by Aaron B. Koontz
Shudder (streaming service) original programming